

References 

Arcade video games